Vyšný Skálnik is a village and municipality in the Rimavská Sobota District of the Banská Bystrica Region of southern Slovakia. Now more or less tourist village with a water reservoir, constructed in the 1970s and now a place for fishing, in winter a skating rink. In the village neighbourhood are chalets and cottages, where their owners from Bratislava, but also other Slovak cities take their rest. It is a birthplace of a poet of Štúr generation, Ján Botto. The village hosts its museum, statue and a plaque on the house where he was born.

References

External links
 
Children´s day in Vyšný Skálnik

Villages and municipalities in Rimavská Sobota District